Galovac may refer to:
 Galovac, Bjelovar-Bilogora County
 Galovac, Zadar County
 Galovac, one of Plitvice Lakes